In geometry, the tetrated dodecahedron is a near-miss Johnson solid.  It was first discovered in 2002 by Alex Doskey.  It was then independently rediscovered in 2003, and named, by Robert Austin.

It has 28 faces:  twelve regular pentagons arranged in four panels of three pentagons each, four equilateral triangles (shown in blue), and six pairs of isosceles triangles (shown in yellow).  All edges of the tetrated dodecahedron have the same length, except for the shared bases of these isosceles triangles, which are approximately 1.07 times as long as the other edges.  This polyhedron has tetrahedral symmetry.

Topologically, as a near-miss Johnson solid, the four triangles corresponding to the face planes of a tetrahedron are always equilateral, while the pentagons and the other triangles only have reflection symmetry.

Related polyhedra

See also 
 Tetrahedrally diminished dodecahedron

Notes 

Polyhedra